Simeon ben Zoma, also known as Simon ben Zoma, Shimon ben Zoma or simply Ben Zoma, was a tanna of the 1st and 2nd centuries CE. His name is used without the title "Rabbi" because, like Ben Azzai, he died at a young age, remaining in the grade of "pupil" and never receiving semikhah (rabbinical ordination). Ben Zoma and Ben Azzai are often mentioned together distinguished representatives of this class. Like Ben Azzai, also, he seems to have belonged to the inner circle of Joshua ben Hananiah's disciples, and a halakhic controversy between them is reported in which Ben Zoma was the victor.

Esoteric contemplation
Ben Zoma was specially noted as an interpreter of the Jewish Scriptures, so that it was said, "With Ben Zoma died the last of the exegetes" ("darshanim").

The principal subject of Ben Zoma's exegetic research was the first chapter of Genesis. One of his questions on this chapter, in which he took exception to the phrase "God made", has been handed down by the Judean aggadists (though without the answer), with the remark, "This is one of the Biblical passages by which Ben Zoma created a commotion all over the world". An interpretation of the second verse of the same chapter has been handed down in a tannaitic tradition, together with the following anecdote: Joshua ben Hananiah was walking one day, when he met Ben Zoma, who was about to pass him without greeting. Thereupon Joshua asked: "Whence and whither, Ben Zoma?" The latter replied: "I was lost in thoughts concerning the account of the Creation." And then he told Joshua his interpretation of Genesis 1:2. When speaking to his disciples on the matter, Joshua said, "Ben Zoma is outside," meaning thereby that Ben Zoma had passed beyond the limit of permitted research.

As a matter of fact, Ben Zoma was one of the four who entered into the "garden" of esoteric knowledge (see Ben Azzai). It was said of him that he beheld the secrets of the garden and "was struck" with mental aberration. The disciples of Akiva applied to the limitless theosophic speculations, for which Ben Zoma had to suffer, the words of Proverbs 25:16, "Have you found honey? eat so much as is sufficient for you, lest you be filled with it, and vomit it".

The "garden" exercise allowed the rabbinate to examine Christian claims and Greek philosophical ideas while formulating the talmudic tradition although the subject never completed his ordination. Conversion to Christianity was the result of the subject's alleged insanity according to Samson H. Levey.

Halachic teachings 
Ben Zoma's erudition in the halakhah became proverbial, for it was said, "Whoever sees Ben Zoma in his dream is assured of scholarship".

Only a few of Ben Zoma's exegetic teachings have been preserved. The most widely known of these is his interpretation of the phrase, "that you may remember the day when you came forth out of Egypt" to prove that the recitation of the biblical passage referring to the Exodus is obligatory for the evening prayer as well as for the morning prayer. This interpretation, quoted with praise by Eleazar ben Azariah, has found a place in the Haggadah for the Passover night.

In a halakhic interpretation, Ben Zoma explains the word "naḳi" (clean) in Exodus 21:28 by referring to the usage of the word in everyday life.

Aggadah
Ben Zoma, seeing the crowds on the Temple Mount, said, "Blessed be He who created all these to attend to my needs. How much had Adam to weary himself withal, until he could find a morsel of bread to eat! He ploughed [the ground], and then sowed it, and then harvested [the grain], and then bound it into sheaves, and then threshed it, and then winnowed it, and then cleansed it, and then ground it, and then sifted it, and then kneaded it, and then baked it, and only then did he eat it; but I get up in the morning and find all this ready before me. How much had Adam to weary himself withal, until he could find clothing to wear! He sheared [the sheep], bleached [the wool], combed and carded it, spun it, wove it, and only then did he find that which to clothe himself; but I rise up in the morning and find all this ready before me. All skilled trades come early at my door, and I have but to rise and I find all these things before me!"

In the closing words of Ecclesiastes, "for this is the whole man," he found the thought expressed, that the pious man is the crown and end of mankind; the whole race ("the whole world") was created only to be of service to him who fears God and respects His commandments.

Quotes

Ben Zoma would say:
Who is wise? He who learns from everyone. As is stated: "From all my teachers I have grown wise";
Who is strong? He who controls his impulses. As is stated: "Better one who is slow to anger than one with might, one who rules his spirit than the captor of a city.";
Who is rich? He who is happy with what he has. As is stated: "If you eat of toil of your hands, fortunate are you, and good is to you";  "fortunate are you" in this world, "and good is to you" in the World to Come;
Who is honored? He who honors everyone! As is stated: "For to those who honor me, I accord honor; those who scorn me shall be demeaned;"

 A grateful guest says, "That host be remembered for good! How many wines he brought up before me; how many portions he placed before me; how many cakes he offered me! All that he did, he did for my sake." But the ill-willed guest says, "What did I eat of his? A piece of bread, a bite of meat. What did I drink? A cup of wine. Whatever he did, he did for the sake of his wife and his children." Thus the Scripture says, "Remember that thou magnify His work, whereof men have sung."

 If you, in repentance, have been ashamed in this world, you will not need to be ashamed before God in the next.

References

 It has the following bibliography:
W. Bacher, Agada der Tannaiten, i. 429;
Z. Frankel, Darke ha-Mishnah, pp. 134–136;
H. Graetz, History of the Jews, ii. 358, 381;
Weiss, Dor, ii. 126;
Braunschweiger, Lehrer der Mischnah, pp. 257–259.

Mishnah rabbis
2nd-century rabbis
Pirkei Avot rabbis